French cruiser Marseillaise may refer to:

 , a  launched in 1935 and sunk during World War II

French Navy ship names